Manuel Pardiñas Serrano (1880 or 1887 – 12 November 1912) was a Spanish anarchist who assassinated José Canalejas, the Prime Minister of Spain. Pardiñas shot Canalejas in front of the San Martín Library in Madrid on 12 November 1912. Pardiñas then turned the gun on himself and committed suicide. He was reportedly from the town of El Grado in the province of Huesca.

References 

Spanish anarchists
Anarchist assassins
1880s births
1912 suicides
Spanish assassins
Suicides by firearm in Spain
Assassins of heads of government
People from Somontano de Barbastro